The 30 mm/82 Compact is a naval autocannon built by Alenia Marconi Systems and Oto-Breda, using the Mauser MK 30 mm Model F gun.

Users

Platforms using the Breda 30/82 mm include:

 
 7 x  Marine Nationale = 14 x Breda 30/82 mm
 2 x  Marine Nationale = 6 x Breda 30/82 mm
 2 x  Marine Nationale = 6 x Breda 30/82 mm

 
 3 x  Hellenic Coast Guard = 3 x Breda SAFS 30/82 mm, local control

 
 P01 Zara Guardia di Finanza = 1 x twin Breda 30/82 mm (decommissioned)
 P02 Vizzarri Guardia di Finanza = 1 x twin Breda 30/82 mm (decommissioned)
 P03 Denaro Guardia di Finanza = 1 x Breda 30/82 mm
 G.1 + G.2 Mazzei class - Bigliani batch IV Guardia di Finanza = 2 x Breda 30/82 mm
 G.3 / G.7 Di Bartolo class - Bigliani batch V Guardia di Finanza = 5 x Breda 30/82 mm
 G.8 + G.9 Di Bartolo class - Bigliani batch VII Guardia di Finanza = 2 x Breda 30/82 mm
 G.92 / G.103 Corrubia class - batch II Guardia di Finanza 12 x Breda 30/82 mm 
 G.78 + G.79 + G.88 + G.89 Bigliani class - batch III Guardia di Finanza 4 x Breda 30/82 mm

6 x Kedah class. Royal Malaysian Navy.1 system for one ship.

 
 6 x  = 6 x Breda SAFS 30/82 mm, local control

 
  Royal Thai Navy = 3 x Breda 30/82 mm

 
  Constitucion class Bolivarian Navy of Venezuela = 3 x Breda 30/82 mm

 
 Brazilian ship Bahia = 3 x Breda 30/82 mm

   = 2 x Marlin-WS 30 mm

References

External links 
 Italy 30 mm/82 (1.2") Compact and Sea Cobra, navweaps.com
  Twin 30 Compact Naval Mount, oai.dtic.mil

Naval guns of Italy
30 mm artillery
Autocannon
Naval anti-aircraft guns